Ramsey Cliff is a rock cliff along Torbert Escarpment, standing 2 nautical miles (3.7 km) northeast of Mount Torbert in the Neptune Range, Pensacola Mountains. Mapped by United States Geological Survey (USGS) from surveys and U.S. Navy air photos, 1956–66. Named by Advisory Committee on Antarctic Names (US-ACAN) for Robert E. Ramsey, storekeeper at Ellsworth Station, winter 1958.

Cliffs of Queen Elizabeth Land